Osterhoudt Stone House is a historic home located at Saugerties in Ulster County, New York.  It was built about 1818 and is a two-story, five by two bay limestone and brownstone building set on a coursed stone foundation and covered by a metal clad gable roof.

It was listed on the National Register of Historic Places in 2001.

References

Houses on the National Register of Historic Places in New York (state)
Houses completed in 1818
Houses in Ulster County, New York
National Register of Historic Places in Ulster County, New York